The Chinese jumping mouse (Eozapus setchuanus) is a species of rodent in the family Dipodidae. It is monotypic within the genus Eozapus. It is endemic to China where its natural habitat is temperate forests, steppes and meadows in mountainous regions. It is tolerant of some degree of habitat destruction, and the International Union for Conservation of Nature has assessed its conservation status as being of "least concern".

Description
The dorsal fur has a band of dark brown running along the spine but is otherwise a reddish-brown or ochraceous colour, the flanks are pale reddish-brown and the underparts are white. In the nominate subspecies, E. s. setchuanus, there is a narrow brown mid-ventral stripe, but in E. s. vicinus the belly is entirely white. The hind limbs are much longer than the fore limbs, and this mouse moves about by crawling or by a series of short hops. The long tail is sparsely clad with short hair, has a white tip, and is otherwise greyish-brown above and white below.

Distribution and habitat
The Chinese jumping mouse is endemic to central China where it occurs in the provinces of Qinghai, Sichuan, Yunnan, Gansu, Ningxia and Shaanxi. It is found in forests, on shrubby steppes and in Alpine meadows. It often lives in cool wooded areas near streams and can also be found in deforested areas where undergrowth develops. It mainly feeds on green plant material.

Status
The Chinese jumping mouse has a wide range and is presumed to have a large total population. The population trend is unknown, but no particular threats to the animal have been detected, it lives in a number of protected areas and is tolerant of habitat disturbance. Any decline in total population is likely to be small and the International Union for Conservation of Nature has assessed the mouse's conservation status as being of "least concern".

References

Mammals described in 1896
Zapodidae
Rodents of China
Taxonomy articles created by Polbot